Don McCauley (born May 12, 1949) is a former American football player.  He was a running back for the University of North Carolina at Chapel Hill from 1968 to 1970 and he attended Garden City High School in Garden City, New York.

McCauley was a two-time First-team All-Conference selection and two-time Conference Player of the Year. He garnered the 1971 ACC Athlete of the Year award. He broke many rushing records and in 2001 he was inducted into the College Football Hall of Fame.

The versatile McCauley contributed to the team as a receiver, rusher, kick returner, and punter, leading the team in most categories. In 1970, he led the nation in rushing with 1,720 yards and all-purpose running with 2,021 yards. His 1,720 yards rushing broke the NCAA record and continues to withstand the test of time ranking as the second highest total in ACC history and the highest at North Carolina. A consensus All-America selection and team captain his senior year, McCauley led the conference in scoring with 21 touchdowns for 126 points and continues to hold numerous school records. His career statistics include 5,014 all-purpose yards, 3,172 rushing yards, 786 yards receiving, and 1,056 yards on kick returns. He also led the team in punting with 48 punts for 1,845 yards—a 38.4 yard average.

With the acquisition of the Miami Dolphins' first round draft pick, awarded to them as compensation for tampering in the hiring of then head coach of the Colts, Don Shula, Baltimore selected McCauley in the first round (22nd overall) in the 1971 NFL draft.

McCauley played 11 seasons in the National Football League (NFL) with the Baltimore Colts.

See also
 List of NCAA major college football yearly rushing leaders
 List of NCAA major college football yearly scoring leaders

References

1949 births
Living people
People from Garden City, New York
Players of American football from Worcester, Massachusetts
Sportspeople from Nassau County, New York
Players of American football from New York (state)
American football running backs
Garden City High School (New York) alumni
North Carolina Tar Heels football players
All-American college football players
College Football Hall of Fame inductees
Baltimore Colts players